James Coulter (born December 1, 1959) is an American billionaire businessman. He is the co-founder of private equity firm TPG Capital, originally known as the Texas Pacific Group.

Early life and education
Coulter was born on December 1, 1959, and raised in a Methodist family, the son of Shirley (née Nagler) and James W. Coulter. His father was a chemical salesman for Chevron. He is a graduate of Shawnee High School in Medford, New Jersey. He graduated summa cum laude from Dartmouth College, where he was also a member of Alpha Chi Alpha. He subsequently earned an MBA from the Stanford Graduate School of Business in 1986, where he was named an Arjay Miller Scholar.

Career
In 1992, Coulter co-founded the Fort Worth and San Francisco-based private equity firm TPG along with David Bonderman. With 14 offices in 10 countries, the firm is one of the largest globally with approximately $50 billion of assets under management. Prior to co-founding TPG in 1992, Coulter and the other co-founders worked for Robert M. Bass. Coulter joined the Robert M. Bass Group from Lehman Brothers Kuhn Loeb.

Coulter has been involved in some of the largest leveraged buyout transactions on record including TPG's marquee transaction, the takeover of Continental Airlines in 1993. He has been involved with TPG's investments in America West Airlines, Burger King, Del Monte Foods, J. Crew, Ducati Motor Holding, Gemplus International, MEMC, ON Semiconductor, Oxford Health Plans, Petco and Seagate Technology.

He is the founder of the Coulter IDEApitch at New Orleans Entrepreneur Week (often referred to as NOEW). Winners of Coulter IDEApitch competition receive a $100,000 investment towards their next round of funding. Winners include Acrew, a video interviewing HR tech product (2017 winner), and AxoSim, a pharmaceutical research company (2018 winner).

In 2020, Forbes ranked him No. 359 on the Forbes 400 list of the richest people in America.

Memberships
Coulter serves as a member on numerous boards:

 Creative Artists Agency
 IMS Health
 Vincraft Group
 Board of Trustees of Dartmouth College
 Stanford University board of trustees
 Common Sense Media
 San Francisco University High School 
 America West Holdings
 Northwest Airlines 
 Oxford Health Plans Inc.
 Genesis Health Ventures Inc.
 Virata Corporation
 San Francisco Zoological Society
 Bay Area Discovery Museum
 San Francisco Day School

Personal life
Coulter is married to Penny Saer from New Orleans. They have three children.

References 

1959 births
Living people
20th-century American businesspeople
21st-century American businesspeople
American billionaires
American chief executives of financial services companies
American financial company founders
American financiers
Businesspeople from Buffalo, New York
Businesspeople from San Francisco
Dartmouth College alumni
People from Burlington County, New Jersey
Private equity and venture capital investors
Shawnee High School (New Jersey) alumni
Stanford Graduate School of Business alumni
Stanford University trustees
TPG Capital people